John Bonner (3 April 1869 – 26 November 1936) was an English cricketer. He played for Essex between 1896 and 1898.

References

External links

1869 births
1936 deaths
English cricketers
Essex cricketers
People from Mile End
Cricketers from Greater London